Gunnaor Assembly constituency is one of the 230 Vidhan Sabha (Legislative Assembly) constituencies of Madhya Pradesh state in central India. This constituency came into existence in 2008, following the delimitation of the legislative assembly constituencies and presently reserved for the candidates belonging to the Scheduled castes.

Overview
Gunnaor (constituency number 59) is one of the 3 Vidhan Sabha constituencies located in Panna district. This constituency covers the entire Gunnaor tehsil, Devendranagar and Kakarhati nagar panchayats and part of Panna tehsil of the district.

Gunnaor is part of Khajuraho Lok Sabha constituency along with seven other Vidhan Sabha segments, namely, Panna and Pawai in this district, Chandla and Rajnagar in Chhatarpur district and Vijayraghavgarh, Murwara and Bahoriband in Katni district.

Members of Legislative Assembly
 2008: Rajesh Kumar Verma, Bharatiya Janata Party
 2013: Mahendra Bagri, Bharatiya Janata Party

See also
 Devendranagar
 Kakarhati

References

Panna district
Assembly constituencies of Madhya Pradesh